Sam George is an American professional surfer, writer, director and screenwriter.  A former competitive surfer, in 1983 George became a contributing editor at Surfing magazine in San Clemente, California, later becoming the magazine's senior editor. His monthly column "Caught Inside" ran until 1990, when he left Surfing and began work at Surfer magazine. George worked at Surfer from 1990 to 1998, when he left the magazine to work on a book project and to help start and edit a free tabloid called SurfNews. He returned to Surfer as executive editor in 2000, a position he held until 2005, when he left the magazine to concentrate on documentary film projects.

In 2007, George directed the documentary The Lost Wave, about his discovery of an indigenous surfing tradition in São Tomé and Príncipe. George has traveled extensively throughout his career, having explored the coastlines of over 40 countries and is credited with the discovery of new surf breaks in West Africa, the Andaman Islands and Madeira. Still very active in surfing, George continues to compete in standup paddle races and tandem events.

Filmography
Writer, Riding Giants (2004) directed by Stacy Peralta
Writer/director, The Lost Wave  (2007)
Writer, Crips and Bloods: Made in America (2008)
Co-Director and Writer, Hollywood Don't Surf! (2010)
Director and Writer, "Hawaiian: The Legend of Eddie Aikau" (2013)

References

External links

The Encyclopedia of Surfing

Place of birth missing (living people)
Year of birth missing (living people)
Living people
American male film actors
Sportswriters from California